SkyAir, legally Sky Capital Airlines, is a cargo airline headquartered in Dhaka, Bangladesh and based at Shahjalal International Airport.

History
The airline received an air operator's certificate (AOC) issued by Civil Aviation Authority, Bangladesh in November 2009. Commercial operations commenced on 26 January 2010.

Fleet

The SkyAir fleet consists of the following aircraft (as of August 2019):

The airline previously operated two Lockheed L-1011F TriStar aircraft prior to scrapping one of them.

In March 2010, one of the L-1011Fs caught fire due to an engine failure.

See also
 List of airlines of Bangladesh

References

External links

Airlines of Bangladesh
Airlines established in 2009
Cargo airlines of Bangladesh
Bangladeshi companies established in 2009